Herenilson Caifalo do Carmo (born 27 August 1996), commonly known as Herenilson, is an Angolan footballer who currently plays as a midfielder for Primeiro de Agosto in the Angolan league.

In October 2020, he signed a one-year deal with Angolan side Primeiro de Agosto.

Career statistics

Club

Notes

International

References

External links

1996 births
Living people
Angolan footballers
Angola international footballers
Association football midfielders
Atlético Petróleos de Luanda players
Girabola players
2019 Africa Cup of Nations players
Angola A' international footballers
2018 African Nations Championship players
2022 African Nations Championship players